The 2009 Ethias Trophy was a professional tennis tournament played on indoor hard courts. It was the fifth edition of the tournament which was part of the Tretorn SERIE+ of the 2009 ATP Challenger Tour. It took place in Mons, Belgium between 5 and 11 October 2009.

Singles main-draw entrants

Seeds

 Rankings are as of September 28, 2009.

Other entrants
The following players received wildcards into the singles main draw:
  Ruben Bemelmans
  Arthur de Greef
  David Goffin
  Yannick Vandenbulcke

The following players received entry from the qualifying draw:
  Sergei Bubka
  Jérôme Haehnel
  Dominik Hrbatý
  Illya Marchenko

Champions

Singles

 Janko Tipsarević def.  Sergiy Stakhovsky, 7–6(4), 6–3

Doubles

 Denis Istomin /  Evgeny Korolev def.  Alejandro Falla /  Teymuraz Gabashvili, 6–7(4), 7–6(4), [11–9]

External links
Official website
ITF Search 
2009 Draws

 
Ethias Trophy
Ethias Trophy
Ethias Trophy